Abudimus (died 305) was a Greek Christian martyr also known as Abudemius of Bozcaada.

Abudimus was tortured during the Diocletian persecution on the island of Tenedos, before dying in 305. The reason for the martyrdom was that the saint did not want to eat meat sacrificed to idols.

Abudimus is regarded as a saint by both the Roman Catholic Church and the Eastern Orthodox Church, with a feast day of July 15.

References

Sources
Holweck, F. G. A Biographical Dictionary of the Saints. St. Louis, MO: B. Herder Book Co. 1924.

External links
Santiebeati: Saint Abudimus
Catholic Online: Saint Abudimus
Ramsgate Benedictine Monks of St. Augustine's Abbey, The Book of Saints (Reference), May 31, 2002, Publisher: A & C Black Publishers Ltd; 7th edition, 
Matthew Bunson, Encyclopedia of Saints, Second Edition, July 2, 2014, Publisher: Our Sunday Visitor; 2nd ed. edition, 

3rd-century births
305 deaths
Saints from Roman Anatolia
4th-century Christian martyrs
4th-century Romans
Christians martyred during the reign of Diocletian